Aarnes or Årnes is a Norwegian surname. Notable people with the surname include:

Asbjørn Aarnes (1923–2013), Norwegian literary historian
Hans Aarnes (1886–1960), Norwegian journalist
Sverre Årnes (born 1949), Norwegian writer
Tom Aage Aarnes (born 1977), Norwegian ski jumper

See also
Arnes (disambiguation)

Norwegian-language surnames